The Bare Range  is a mountain range of the Canadian Rockies, located south of the Red Deer River valley in Banff National Park, Canada. The range is named for the "bareness" of or lack of trees on the gentle slopes of the range.

This range includes the following mountains and peaks:

See also 
 Ranges of the Canadian Rockies

References

Mountain ranges of Alberta
Ranges of the Canadian Rockies
Mountains of Banff National Park